The Sébastien Faure Century was the French/Italian contingent of the Durruti Column during the Spanish Civil War, named for the anarchist of the same name. It formed the First Century of the International Group, and consisted of about fifty members from France, Italy, and other countries. Initially started by French nationals who had gone to Spain to help fight the Fascists, the group soon merged with Italian nationals and others, including the Algerian Sail Mohamed.

Notable members
Sail Mohamed
Jean Mayol
Marcel Montagut
Pierre Odéon (one of the founders)
Simone Weil
George Sossenko
Antonio Altarriba Lope

References

Sources

 Skirda, Alexandre (2002). Facing the Enemy: A History of Anarchist Organization from Proudhon to May 1968, Oakland: AK Press, .

Confederal militias
Anarchist organisations in Spain
Foreign volunteers in the Spanish Civil War
Defunct anarchist militant groups
Left-wing militant groups in Spain